

Draw
The draw was made on May 23, 2009 at 22:00 EET. Matches will be settled by a penalty shootout immediately after the match should a tie end in a draw. The stadia were selected by the Libyan Football Federation.

Ties to be played week commencing May 31, 2009

Fixtures and results
Fixtures announced on May 24, 2009Division of each club in parentheses

1 Zidane's goal was timed at 20 seconds.

References

4